In algebra, the real radical of an ideal I in a polynomial ring with real coefficients is the largest ideal containing I with the same vanishing locus.
It plays a similar role in real algebraic geometry that the radical of an ideal plays in algebraic geometry over an algebraically closed field.
More specifically, the Nullstellensatz says that when I is an ideal in a polynomial ring with coefficients coming from an algebraically closed field, the radical of I is the set of polynomials vanishing on the vanishing locus of I. In real algebraic geometry, the Nullstellensatz fails as the real numbers are not algebraically closed. However, one can recover a similar theorem, the real Nullstellensatz, by using the real radical in place of the (ordinary) radical.

Definition

References 
Marshall, Murray Positive polynomials and sums of squares. Mathematical Surveys and Monographs, 146. American Mathematical Society, Providence, RI, 2008. xii+187 pp. ; 0-8218-4402-4

Notes

Ideals (ring theory)